The Defence Research and Development Organisation (DRDO) (IAST: Raksā Anūsandhān Evam Vikās Sangaṭhan) is the premier agency under the Department of Defence Research and Development in Ministry of Defence of the Government of India, charged with the military's research and development, headquartered in Delhi, India. It was formed in 1958 by the merger of the Technical Development Establishment and the Directorate of Technical Development and Production of the Indian Ordnance Factories with the Defence Science Organisation. Subsequently, Defence Research & Development Service (DRDS) was constituted in 1979 as a service of Group 'A' Officers / Scientists directly under the administrative control of Ministry of Defence.

With a network of 52 laboratories that are engaged in developing defence technologies covering various fields like aeronautics, armaments, electronics, land combat engineering, life sciences, materials, missiles, and naval systems, DRDO is India's largest and most diverse research organisation. The organisation includes around 5,000 scientists belonging to the DRDS and about 25,000 other subordinate scientific, technical, and supporting personnel.

History

The DRDO was established in 1958 by combining the Defense Science Organisation and some of the technical development establishments. A separate Department of Defense Research and Development was formed in 1980, which later administered DRDO and its almost 30 laboratories and establishments (there were almost 52 labs before merging). Most of the time, the Defense Research and Development Organisation was treated as if it were a vendor and the Army Headquarters or the Air Force Headquarters were the customers. Because the Army and the Air Force themselves did not have any design or construction responsibility, they tended to treat the designer or Indian industry at par with their corresponding designer in the world market. If they could get a MiG-21 from the world market, they wanted a MiG-21 from DRDO.

DRDO started its first major project in surface-to-air missiles (SAM) known as Project Indigo in the 1960s. Indigo was discontinued in later years without achieving full success. Project Indigo led to Project Devil, along with Project Valiant, to develop short-range SAM and ICBM in the 1970s. Project Devil itself led to the later development of the Prithvi missile under the Integrated Guided Missile Development Programme (IGMDP) in the 1980s. IGMDP was an Indian Ministry of Defence programme between the early 1980s and 2007 for the development of a comprehensive range of missiles, including the Agni missile, Prithvi ballistic missile, Akash missile, Trishul missile and Nag Missile. In 2010, defence minister A. K. Antony ordered the restructuring of the DRDO to give 'a major boost to defence research in the country and to ensure effective participation of the private sector in defence technology'. The key measures to make DRDO effective in its functioning include the establishment of a Defence Technology Commission with the defence minister as its chairman. The programmes which were largely managed by DRDO have seen considerable success with many of the systems seeing rapid deployment as well as yielding significant technological benefits. Since its establishment, DRDO has created other major systems and critical technologies such as aircraft avionics, UAVs, small arms, artillery systems, EW Systems, tanks and armoured vehicles, sonar systems, command and control systems and missile systems.

Organisation

Cluster Laboratories/Establishments 

As part of rationalization plan, Defence Terrain Research Laboratory (DTRL) was merged with Snow and Avalanche Studies Establishment (SASE) which is renamed into Defence Geological Research Establishment (DGRE). As of 2020, Advanced Numerical Research and Analysis Group (ANURAG) and Laser Science and Technology Center (LASTEC) are no longer functional as independent entities. The staffs are relocated at various DRDO labs in Hyderabad. DRDO is planning to build a new research lab in Lucknow.

HR Institutions

Other Institutions

Centres of Excellence

Projects

Industry linkages, technology transfer and indigenisation 

India domestically produces only 45% to 50% of defence products it uses, and the rest are imported. To become technology research and production leader, reduce reliance on the imports and increase self-reliance, DRDO Chief called for more collaboration with the industry, private sector, research and education institutes including IITs and NITs. India's military–industrial complex has had little success and only recently private sector was allowed to enter the defence production. To expedite the development cycle of new technologies and to better fit the end user requirements, army has asked DRDO to take more army staff on deputation to be part of DRDO technology development project teams.

Indian forces are using numerous indigenous technologies produced by the DRDO, including Varunastra, Maareech, Ushus, TAL by navy; Electronic Warfare Technologies, radars, composite materials for LCA, AEW&C, Astra, LCA Tejas by airforce; and ASAT, BrahMos, ASTRA, Nag missile, SAAW, Arjun MBT Mk 1A, 46-metre Modular Bridge, MPR, LLTR Ashwin by the army. In September 2019, DRDO formulated the "DRDO Policy and Procedures for Transfer of Technology" and released information on "DRDO-Industry Partnership: Synergy and Growth and DRDO Products with Potential for Export".

During the Vibrant Goa Global Expo and Summit 2019 in October, DRDO signed technology transfer contracts with 16 Indian companies, including 3 startups, to produce products for the use by Indian Armed Forces. This included high shelf life, high nutrition, ready-to-eat on-the-go food products to be consumed in the difficult terrain and bad weather. DRDO and ISRO have agreed to collaborate in India's crewed orbital spacecraft project called Gaganyaan during which DRDOs various laboratories will tailor their defence capabilities to suit the needs of ISRO's human space mission with critical human-centric systems and technologies like space grade food, crew healthcare, radiation measurement and protection, parachutes for the safe recovery of the crew module and fire suppression system etc. Kalyani Group is developing the DRDO Advanced Towed Artillery Gun System (ATAGS).

DRDO with Federation of Indian Chambers of Commerce & Industry (FICCI) under Advance Assessment Technology and Commercialisation Programme is helping Lakes and Waterways Development Authority (LAWDA) to keep Dal Lake clean by providing low cost Biodigesters for the treatment of human excreta, animal waste disposal, grey water and kitchen waste release that works fine in ambient as well as sub zero temperature which are also supplied to Indian Railways.

Defence Research and Development Establishment (DRDE) which works in the field of chemical weapon, biological agent detection and research is helping Indian Council of Medical Research (ICMR) in augmenting diagnostic capability for COVID–19 outbreak. It has created special hand sanitiser formulation and diagnostic kits following WHO standards and guidelines that are supplied in large numbers to civilian and defence officials. Medical staff all over India dealing with Coronavirus contamination are using protective waterproof clothing with special sealant used in submarine applications developed by Institute of Nuclear Medicine and Allied Sciences (INMAS) for CBRN defense that is made up of high strength polyester coated with breathable polymer. The clothing underwent successful trials at the South India Textile Research Association and exceeds the criteria of currently available suits in the market. The suit is washable, passed all critical CBRN and ASTM standards and is now manufactured by two private players, Venus Industries from Mumbai and IMTEC from Kolkata. Defence Bioengineering and Electromedical Laboratory (DEBEL) developed causality evacuation bag for COVID-19 infected patients that can withstand Chemical, Biological, Radiological and Nuclear (CBRN) environments and is protected against blood and viral penetration. The bag is made up of durable water repellent nonwoven fabric. It is rigid cylindrical in shape with air and water proof zippers and ventilators. Already ordered 500 in numbers, DRDO will now transfer the technology to private sector for manufacturing.

Under Society for Biomedical Technology (SBMT) programme, DEBEL has developed five-layer nanomesh based N99 masks and is collaborating with startup company Scanray Tech for the production of ventilators using current available technologies with Indian made parts due to unavailability of imports. It is also working on a new multiplexed ventilator technology that will be able to support several infected individuals on a single ventilator. The prototype development stage is complete and the initial model is now undergoing various improvements suggested by a team of medical researchers and doctors. The technology will finally be transferred to Tata Motors, Mahindra and Mahindra, Hyundai Motor India, Honda Cars India and Maruti Suzuki for immediate mass production. DRDO signed agreement with Indian Telephone Industries Limited for tech transfer on low cost multiplexed ventilator technology with 80% to 90% of components are now make in India.

DRDO as of 11 April 2020 transferred technologies to 30 major companies to manufacture various non-medicine products against the COVID-19 pandemic which includes ventilator, sanitiser, personal protective equipment, face shield and isolation shelter. The technology for the newly developed multiplexed ventilator came from on-board oxygen generation system (OBOGS) developed for HAL Tejas. Private sector players like Raksha Polycoats and Accurate Savan Defence are now producing protective clothing, isolation shelters based on DRDO tech developed for high altitude pulmonary edema (HAPE) bags, submarine escape suit and satellite recovery systems. Hyderabad based jewellary making startup iMake with Modern Manufacturers and Kirat Mechanical Engineering from Chandigarh, Wipro 3D from Bengaluru and Global Healthcare from Delhi are 3D printing visor-based face shields which is an offshoot of the tech developed for high-altitude military parachuting. Setco from Mumbai is producing sealants developed for submarines of Indian Navy at DRDO labs for personal protection equipments.

Research Centre Imarat (RCI) and Terminal Ballistics Research Laboratory (TBRL) developed product called Aerosol Containment Box for enclosure of intubation procedure made with Poly(methyl methacrylate). It is cubical in shape designed for both adults and minors that covers the COVID-19 infected patients during medical examination and treatment from head to chest to stop the transmission of droplets containing the virus to others. Employees' State Insurance Corporation Medical College, Hyderabad helped RCI in prototype development while Postgraduate Institute of Medical Education and Research helped in testing, validation and acceptance of product for medical use. The technology is now transferred to private industries located in Chandigardh and Hyderabad for mass manufacturing. RCI at DRDO Missile Complex, Hyderabad is now supplying technology of brushless DC motors (BLDC) used for missile actuators and high response solenoid valves used in missile control for ventilator pumps that validated the prototype testing stages.

Centre for Fire, Explosive and Environment Safety (CFEES) developed two sanitising equipments of 50 litres tank capacity consists of portable backpack type that covers an area of 300 metres while another trolley mounted for large area sanitisation of up to 3000 metres by spraying 1% hypochlorite solution.

Vehicle Research and Development Establishment (VRDE) developed portable disinfection chamber and special face protection mask for health professionals combating COVID-19 outbreak in India. The personnel decontamination system is equipped with sanitiser and soap dispenser. The full-body decontamination starts using for pedal with an electrically operated pump creating disinfectant mist of 700-litre of hypo sodium chloride. The system takes 25 seconds for full decontamination with automatic shut-off procedure and can decontaminate 650 personnels until next refill. The face mask developed for COVID-19 patients uses the A4 size Over-Head Projection (OHP) film for protection and light weight materials for long duration comfortable use. VRDE developed full-body decontamination chamber was designed and validated within 4 days with All India Institute of Medical Sciences, New Delhi became the first premier institution to use it. The mass manufacturing of the portable decontamination chamber is now done by Dass Hitachi Limited.

Development cum Production Partner programme 
As part of Make In India and Atmanirbhar Bharat initiative, DRDO under Development cum Production Partner programme (DCPP) allowed handholding of domestic private sector industries to improve their development and production cycle of complex defence systems.

VL-SRSAM (Vertical Launch - Short Range Surface to Air Missile) and Advanced Towed Artillery Gun System (ATAGS) became some of the successful projects of this programme.

Hindustan Aeronautics Limited on 17 December 2021, secured order for manufacturing, assembly, integration, testing and supply of DRDO Abhyas from Aeronautical Development Establishment. The order will be completed under Development-cum-Production Partner (DcPP) with a private sector industry.

On 16 December 2021, Ashok Leyland signed partnership agreement with Combat Vehicles Research and Development Establishment (CVRDE) to develop 600 hp engine for Future Combat Vehicle Programme. Instruments Research and Development Establishment (IRDE) on 27 December 2021 transferred technologies for developing border surveillance system to Indian private sector company Paras Defence and Space. The system consists of radar, electro-optical sensors mounted on pan tilt platform. On 28 December 2021, Defence Institute of Physiology and Allied Sciences (DIPAS) transferred technology to manufacture extreme cold weather clothing system to RHD Business Services, SBNX Innovation, Shiva Texyarn Limited, Kusumgar Corporates and Ginni Filaments Limited.

See also 
 Aeronautical Development Agency
 Agency for Defense Development - South Korea
 Bharat Electronics
 Corruption in defence procurement in India
 Defense Advanced Research Projects Agency - United States
 Defence Industry Agency - Turkey
 Defence Institute of Advanced Technology
 Defence Technology Institute - Thailand
 Hindustan Aeronautics Limited
 Military Institute of Armament Technology - Poland
 National Chung-Shan Institute of Science and Technology - Taiwan
 Ordnance Factories Board
 Rafael Advanced Defense Systems - Israel 
 Swedish Defence Research Agency - Sweden

References

External links

The official website of DRDO
DRDO Recruitment: Scientist
DRDO Recruitment: Technical, Admin & Allied Cadre

 
Military units and formations established in 1958
Research and development organizations
Defence agencies of India
Ministry of Defence (India)
Nuclear weapons programme of India
1958 establishments in Delhi
Government agencies of India